Ingibjörg Sólrún Gísladóttir (born 31 December 1954) is an Icelandic politician from the Social Democratic Alliance who has served as Minister for Foreign Affairs (2007–2009) and leader of the Alliance (2005–2009). She served as representative of UN Women in Afghanistan from 2012-2014 and later in Turkey as designated Regional Director for Europe and Central Asia.

Education 
Sólrún received her bachelor's degree in history and literature from the University of Iceland in 1979. Then she went to Denmark to study as a guest student of the post -graduate studies in history at the University of Copenhagen (1979-1981). In 1981 she came back to Iceland where she graduated as a cand.mag. in history from University of Iceland in 1983.

In addition to her Icelandic, Sólrún speaks English, French and Danish.

Political career
Sólrún started her political career in the Women's List (Samtök um kvennalista), a party she had co-founded in 1982 and later represented in Reykjavík's City Council from 1982 to 1988. She also represented the party in Parliament from 1991 to 1994.

Sólrún became Mayor of Reykjavík in 1994 when she led a coalition of four political parties called Reykjavíkurlistinn, winning the elections. She was the city's Mayor until 2003.

In 2004 Sólrún took a brief leave from politics and instead attended the European Institute, London School of Economics (LSE) as a visiting scholar.

In 2005 Sólrún became the leader of the Social Democratic Alliance (Samfylkingin), then the second largest political party in the Althing (Iceland's parliament), after a sharply contested election between her and the previous party leader Össur Skarphéðinsson. She has served in this position until 2009.

On 24 May 2007, Sólrún was appointed foreign minister and served in the office until 1 February 2009.

Later career
On 19 July 2017, Sólrún began her mandate as the Director of OSCE Office for Democratic Institutions and Human Rights, where she succeeded Michael Georg Link. In June 2020, the governments of Tajikistan and Turkey blocked the renewal of Ingibjörg Sólrún's mandate. She subsequently led the OSCE's Observation Mission in the 2020 Ukrainian local elections.  

In 2021, Sólrún was appointed by United Nations Secretary-General António Guterres as his new Deputy Special Representative for Political Affairs and Electoral Assistance of the United Nations Assistance Mission for Iraq (UNAMI), under the leadership of Special Representative Jeanine Hennis-Plasschaert.

In August 2022, Guterres appointed Sólrún to the United Nations fact-finding mission regarding the Olenivka prison massacre, led by Carlos Alberto dos Santos Cruz.

Other activities 
 Center for International Peace Operations (ZIF), Member of the International Advisory Board
 Nordic Women Mediators (NWM), Member

Personal life
Sólrún was born in Reykjavík on 31 December 1954. She is married to Hjörleifur Sveinbjörnsson, lecturer and translator of Chinese language. They have two sons.

References

External links
Ministry for Foreign Affairs of Iceland
Alþingi biography

1954 births
Living people
Ingibjorg Solrun Gisladottir
Ingibjorg Solrun Gisladottir
Ingibjorg Solrun Gisladottir
Ingibjorg Solrun Gisladottir
Female foreign ministers
Ingibjorg Solrun Gisladottir
Ingibjorg Solrun Gisladottir
Ingibjorg Solrun Gisladottir
20th-century Icelandic women politicians
20th-century Icelandic politicians
21st-century Icelandic women politicians
21st-century Icelandic politicians
Ingibjorg Solrun Gisladottir
OSCE ODIHR directors
Female defence ministers